Diesel Only Records is a Brooklyn-based country music record label established in 1990 by musician-journalist Jeremy Tepper, then also the lead singer of the World Famous Blue Jays.

History
Tepper, along with Diesel Only's cofounders, Jay Sherman-Godfrey and Albert Caiati, originally started the label with the goal of releasing vinyl 45s for use in jukeboxes at truck stops. Tepper also started the label with the goal of releasing his own band's albums, as well as those by other young bands from New York City. The first non-vinyl record the label released was 1992's Rig Rock Jukebox, which was also their first singles compilation album. Also that year, the label released a single by Mark Brine entitled "New Blue Yodel," which, after Brine sent it to Hank Snow, landed him a gig at the Grand Ole Opry that July. By the end of 1993, Diesel Only had released more than 30 records by artists from all across the United States. The label did not become well-known until 1996, when its third singles compilation album, "Rig Rock Deluxe", was released, as part of a deal with Upstart Records. The album included songs by Buck Owens, Steve Earle, and Marty Stuart, and won Americana Album of the Year from the National Association of Independent Record Distributors. Tepper has recalled that after Owens agreed to contribute "Will There Be Big Rigs in Heaven?" to the album, they merely had to mention that he had signed on to the project, after which "we [Diesel Only] got anybody we wanted." "Rig Rock Deluxe" received a favorable review from Billboard, which described it as the label's best compilation yet.

In 1996, Peter Blackstock wrote in No Depression that through his work with Diesel Only, "Jeremy Tepper has established himself as a unique and indispensable cog in the alt-country underground." In 1997, Tepper married fellow musician Laura Cantrell. The label first diverged from its pattern of releasing compilations of trucker music in 2000, when it released Cantrell's debut album, Not the Tremblin' Kind. Cantrell and Tepper later became the co-owners and co-operators of Diesel Only. Cantrell has released all but one of her albums on Diesel Only (as of 2011).

Artists
Artists who have released albums on Diesel Only include, but are not limited to:
Dale Watson
World Famous Blue Jays
Amy Allison
Laura Cantrell
Will Rigby
Tammy Faye Starlite
Ween

References

Record labels established in 1990
American country music record labels
1990 establishments in New York City